Ma Mei Ha Leng Tsui or Leng Tsui is a village in Fanling, North District, Hong Kong.

Administration
Ma Mei Ha Leng Tsui is a recognized village under the New Territories Small House Policy.

See also
 Ma Mei Ha

References

External links
 Delineation of area of existing village Leng Tsui (Fanling) for election of resident representative (2019 to 2022)

Villages in North District, Hong Kong
Fanling